The Social Democratic Party is a political party in Papua New Guinea. It was founded in June 2010 by Port Moresby Governor Powes Parkop.

It won three seats at the 2012 election: Parkop (National Capital District Provincial), Justin Tkatchenko (Moresby South Open) and Joseph Yopyyopy (Wosera-Gawi). It supported the government of Prime Minister Peter O'Neill, and Tkatchenko was appointed as Minister for Sport. Yopyyopy later defected to the United Resources Party, while Tkatchenko joined the People's National Congress.

As of May 2019, the party has 2 seats in the National Parliament.

References

Political parties in Papua New Guinea
Social democratic parties in Oceania
2010 establishments in Papua New Guinea
Political parties established in 2010